Rejcov Grič is an isolated settlement in the hills west of Idrija in the traditional Inner Carniola region of Slovenia. It includes the hamlets and isolated farms of Rejc, Rupa, and Lebanovše.

History
Rejcov Grič was separated from Čekovnik and made a settlement in its own right in 2006.

Name
The name Rejcov Grič literally means 'Rejc's hill' and refers to Rejc Hill, which rises northwest of the hamlet of Rejc. The newly founded settlement was initially officially named Rejcov grič (with a small g) in Slovene. However, this was declared an orthographic error a month later, and the official Slovene spelling was changed to Rejcov Grič (with a big G).

Cultural heritage
A Second World War monument stands in the eastern part of the settlement, in the hamlet of Lebanovše. It was installed in 1969 and consists of a granite plaque mounted on a stone base topped by a stylized representation of Mount Triglav.

References

External links
Rejcov Grič on Geopedia

Populated places in the Municipality of Idrija